Sijarinska Banja is a spa town located in the municipality of Medveđa, southern Serbia. It is famous for having many springs and an 8-meter-tall geyser surrounded by an artificial pool. As of 2011 census, it has a population of 376 inhabitants.

See also
 List of spa towns in Serbia

References

Populated places in Jablanica District
Spa towns in Serbia
Albanian communities in Serbia